Kenny Dalglish is a Scottish retired football player, who represented the Scotland national football team from 1971 to 1986. During that time he scored 30 international goals in 102 appearances. This made him the all-time top goalscorer for Scotland, a status he has jointly held with Denis Law since scoring his 30th goal in 1984.

Dalglish is the only Scottish male player to have made at least 100 international appearances. He finished second in the Ballon d'Or voting in 1983. Dalglish was selected for Scotland squads in the 1974, 1978 and 1982 World Cups.

List of goals scored
Scores and results list Scotland's goal tally first.

Statistics

See also
 List of international goals scored by Denis Law
 Scotland national football team records and statistics

References

Dalglish, Kenny
Dalglish, Kenny